O'Neill's is an Irish-themed pub chain with 49 outlets in the United Kingdom. The chain is operated by Mitchells & Butlers, one of the largest pub companies in the UK. Pubs are located across the whole of the UK, except for Northern Ireland, where there are none.

The chain's focus is on Irish music, an Irish inspired food menu and Irish drinks such as Guinness, Jameson and Baileys.

History
The first O'Neill's was opened in Aberdeen in 1994 by Bass, the largest pub company in the UK at the time. A second O'Neill's opened at Covent Garden in 1995. By 1996, there were 52 and it was Bass's most successful pub chain. By 1996, Bass was opening more than one a month, and had spent £40 million on the pub chain. Ten opened in September 1996 alone. Bass owned Caffrey's ale, which was launched by the company around the same time as O'Neill's. By late 1996, Bass was opening a branch of O'Neill's every week.

By the end of 1997, Bass had over 250 Irish-themed pubs. Bass acquired the 40-strong Scruffy Murphy's Irish pub chain from Allied Domecq in 1999.

By June 2003, Mitchells and Butlers had 91 O'Neill's.

From 2012, M&B began to rebrand some locations as "O'Neill's Irish Pub & Kitchen".  By 2013, the chain's estate had reduced to 49 public houses.

Operation
The pubs specialise in Irish music, food and drinks, especially Guinness, Smithwick's (for which it has exclusive rights in Great Britain), and, until early 2013, Caffrey's Irish Ale. On St. Patrick's Day, they sell over 71,000 pints of Guinness.

See also
 List of Irish themed restaurants

References

External links
 O'Neills
 Mitchells & Butlers
 

1994 establishments in the United Kingdom
Irish restaurants
Mitchells & Butlers
Pub chains
Restaurants established in 1994